George Thomas Saimes (September 1, 1941 – March 8, 2013) was an American football defensive back and fullback for Michigan State University and the Buffalo Bills of the American Football League, which produced American Football League Championships in 1964 and 1965.

Saimes was born and died in Canton, Ohio.  In 1964, he had a career-high six interceptions and earned the first of his five American Football League All-Star Game appearances. He made The Sporting News All-AFL Team in 1964, 1965 and 1967.  Former Pro Football writer and president of the Pro Football Writers Association, Larry Felser, calls Saimes "the finest open-field tackler in the league."

He achieved All-American Football League honors five times, and is a member of the  American Football League All-Time Team, the Buffalo Bills' Wall of Fame, and the Greater Buffalo Sports Hall of Fame.

Saimes went on to be a professional football scout with the Blesto V Combine, the Tampa Bay Buccaneers, the Washington Redskins, and the Houston Texans. Saimes died in Canton of leukemia on March 8, 2013.

See also
 List of American Football League players

References

1941 births
2013 deaths
American football safeties
Buffalo Bills players
Denver Broncos players
Michigan State Spartans football players
Washington Redskins executives
All-American college football players
American Football League All-Star players
American Football League All-Time Team
Players of American football from Canton, Ohio
Deaths from leukemia
American Football League players